The Pirates Center of Belarus is a community of people who support freedom of knowledge, reform of copyright, privacy of personal information and transparent government.

History
The Pirates Center of Belarus was founded in Minsk at the end of 2012. It was the third attempt to create a pirate movement in Belarus.

A website, online social network communities, and contacts with the pirate parties of various countries (such as Russia, Ukraine, Latvia, Poland, Czech Republic, Catalonia, and Spain) were created during the 2nd half of 2012.

From April 19 to April 21, 2013, the Pirates Center of Belarus took part in the general assembly of Pirate Parties International (PPI) and was accepted as an official member of the Pirate Parties International.

Purposes and Principles

The main purpose of the Pirates Center of Belarus is the dismantling of the existing copyright laws. It also advocates:
 Alternative licenses and the free choice of the author
 Openness and transparency in government decision-making
 Greater availability of high-speed Internet
 The right to privacy on the internet and in real life
 Free and open knowledge
 Open source software in the social sphere, education and culture

The Pirates Center also claims to uphold the following principles: 
 Openness
 Alternativeness
 Initiative
 Action

Activities

As of 2013 the main activity of the Pirates Center is education; this includes the organization of public lectures, panel discussions, and film viewings.
Other activities include:
 CryptoParties
 Meeting with informal creativists
 Taking part in IT conferences
 Audio sets with pirates of different countries
 Learning copyright laws
 Localization of articles and video subtitles into Russian and Belarusian
 Writing reviews
 Making polls
 Gathering information for libraries and media

References

Belarus
Non-profit organizations based in Belarus
Political organizations established in 2012
2012 establishments in Belarus